Charles Shawn McShane (born January 4, 1954) is a former American football linebacker in the National Football League for the Seattle Seahawks. He played college football at California Lutheran College.

Early years
McShane attended Robert A. Millikan High School, where he practiced football and track. He enrolled at Long Beach City College after graduating from high school. 

He transferred to California Lutheran College after his sophomore season to play defensive tackle under head coach Bob Shoup. As a junior, McShane was named NAIA District II second-team, receiving the team's Iron Man and most valuable lineman awards.

As a senior, he was named NAIA District III first-team All-American, third-team Associated Press Little All-American, UPI Little All-Coast, First-team All-Lutheran and NAIA District III Player of the Year. He also was a part of the 1976 undefeated track team, competing in the javelin throw.

In 2008, he was inducted into the California Lutheran University Alumni Association Athletic Hall of Fame.

Professional career

Dallas Cowboys
McShane was selected by the Dallas Cowboys in the 12th round (346th overall) of the 1976 NFL Draft, with the intention of being converted into a linebacker. He was waived on September 6.

Seattle Seahawks
On April 29, 1977, he was signed as a free agent by the Seattle Seahawks. He played mainly on special teams. He had 10 tackles and one forced fumble against the Buffalo Bills. He blocked a field goal against the Houston Oilers.

In 1978, he played mainly on special teams. He had 5 tackles against the Minnesota Vikings. On September 5, 1979, he was released after playing in the season opener against the San Diego Chargers.

References

1954 births
Living people
Players of American football from Long Beach, California
American football linebackers
Long Beach City Vikings football players
Cal Lutheran Kingsmen football players
Seattle Seahawks players